Magno Batista da Silva (born 21 September 1988), known as just Magno, is a Brazilian football defender who most recently plays for Pars Jonoubi in the Persian Gulf Pro League.

Club career
In 2011, Magno played 11 games for Esporte Clube Santo André. In June 2011, he transferred to Damash in the Iran Pro League. In the summer of 2012 he signed  a one-year contract with Naft Tehran. He returned to Brazil in 2013 and signed with Novo Hamburgo.

Gostaresh Foolad
He returned to Iran in the summer of 2014 and signed a two year contract with Persian Gulf Pro League side Gostaresh Foolad. After settling in well with the club, Magno was received a two year contract extension to the end of the 2017–18 season.

References

External links
 Persianleague Profile
 

1981 births
Living people
Brazilian footballers
Brazilian expatriate footballers
Santos FC players
Expatriate footballers in Iran
Damash Gilan players
Naft Tehran F.C. players
Gostaresh Foulad F.C. players
Sanat Naft Abadan F.C. players
Persian Gulf Pro League players
Association football midfielders
Brazilian expatriate sportspeople in Iran
Pars Jonoubi Jam players